Black is a Hindi language Indian television series that aired on 9X. The series stars Mamik Singh and Aaliya Shah who investigate and try to solve several mysterious deaths. The series was premiered on 2 March 2009 and is produced by Sunil Agnihotri.

In 2011, a reprisal series titled Kaala Saaya aired on Sahara One between 24 January to 1 July 2011.

Cast
Mamik Singh as Officer Ranvir Singh
 Natasha Sinha as Sudha Malhotra
Vinod Kapoor as Ravi Malhotra
Shiva Rindani as Father D'Cunha 
Aaliya Shah as Aaliya
Anwar Fatehan as Professor Bishnoi / Baba
Yash Belani as Rahul Malhotra
Kruttika Desai as Rubi Gujral
Vindu Dara Singh as Rajeev Saxena
Reema Debnath as Church Nun

See also
 List of Hindi horror shows

References

External links

Kaala Saaya Official Site on Sahara One

9X (TV channel) original programming
Indian horror fiction television series
2009 Indian television series debuts